

Route
Parts of the route are currently incomplete and some sections follow other routes.

London to Milton Keynes

The proposed route is to begin in central London, running from  via Paddington railway station to the Grand Union Canal. The towpath alongside the canal between Paddington and Northolt is already designated as a local cycle path, and will eventually form part of Route 6 when the route is completed. The canal continues to Uxbridge where the National Cycle Route 6 joins National Cycle Route 61 at Cowley, near Brunel University, sharing the same path until the two routes diverge at St Albans. The route continues along the Grand Union Canal and the Colne Valley on mainly traffic-free routes. At Rickmansworth it joins the Ebury Way, a rail trail which runs along a former line of the Watford and Rickmansworth Railway. Entering central Watford, the route continues north via St Albans with some on-road sections to Harpenden, where it intersects with National Cycle Route 57 and the Chiltern Cycleway. It then progresses along the River Lea via Luton, along the Sewell Greenway before joining the road network to reach Leighton Buzzard. At this point it re-joins the Grand Union Canal (Grand Junction Branch) to Milton Keynes.

Milton Keynes
 
Route 6 enters Milton Keynes from the south following the Grand Union Canal through southern Bletchley. After a loop through central Bletchley close to Bletchley railway station and Bletchley Park, it resumes its track northwards via Fenny Stratford along the valley of the River Ouzel (near The Open University and the Milton Keynes University Hospital) to Campbell Park (where it intersects National Cycle Route 51 heading west to Central Milton Keynes and Milton Keynes Central railway station). At Great Linford, NCR6 heads west  along the former Wolverton to Newport Pagnell Line (now a rail trail). At Old Wolverton (near Wolverton railway station), the route crosses the River Great Ouse to leave the Milton Keynes Urban Area for the rural villages of Castlethorpe and Hanslope before crossing into Northamptonshire.

Milton Keynes to Derby

Route 6 between Milton Keynes and Derby is the core section of the Sustrans route of the South Midlands. From Market Harborough the route uses the towpath of the Grand Union Canal to reach Foxton Locks from where it is on street to south Leicester. Using the River Soar towpath the route passes south to north through the city. On reaching Watermead Country Park the route returns to the streets to pass through Loughborough and on to Worthington.

Derby to Castleton

From Derby the route heads east through Long Eaton and then turns north in the  western suburbs of Nottingham. Passing Beeston,  Bulwell,  Hucknall and Newstead railway stations before heading northeast through the grounds of Newstead Abbey. From Blidworth the route is northbound and predominantly traffic free as far as Worksop as it passes through Sherwood Pines Forest Park, Sherwood Forest Country Park and Clumber Park. Using the canal towpath between Worksop and Shirebrook the route heads east on country roads to the Rother Valley Country Park. Here it turns north to Rotherham, from where it becomes traffic free joining a towpath for a southwesterly route to Sheffield. Climbing through the streets of Sheffield the route enters the Peak District National Park at Ringinglow and uses the dam wall of Ladybower reservoir to reach Castleton.

Castleton to Reddish

Castleton | Reddish

The route between Caslteton and Reddish has yet to be decided.

Reddish to Bury

From Reddish, National Route 6 enters Manchester via the Fallowfield Loop. Passing through Whalley Range and Manchester city centre it then follows part of the Irwell Sculpture Trail as it runs through Drinkwater Park and north towards Bury.

Bury to Keswick

Related NCN routes
Route 6 meets the following routes:
 61 at Uxbridge and St Albans
 57 at Harpenden
 547 at Sewell
 51 at Milton Keynes
 64 at Market Harborough
 50 at Willoughby Waterleys
 63 at Leicester
 15 at Belton
 52 at Osgathorpe
 54 at Derby
 67 at Long Eaton, Rother Valley Country Park and Meadowhall
 645 at Sherwood Pines Forest Park
 648 at Sherwood Forest
 647 at Clumber Park
 627 at Sheffield
 62 at Reddish Vale and Preston
 55 at Salford and Preston
 622 at Preston
 700 at Conder Green and Milnthorpe
 69 at Lancaster and Hest Bank
 70 at Sedgwick and Natland
 637 at Clappersgate 
 71 at Threlkeld

Route 6 between Derby and Sheffield is part of the Derby to York cycle route along with:

Route 6 between Sheffield and Rother Valley is part of the Trans Pennine Trail (Central) along with:

References

External links

 National Route 6 on the Sustrans website.

National Cycle Routes